Deep Blue C is a compiler for a subset of the C programming language for the Atari 8-bit family distributed by the Atari Program Exchange (APX). The compiler is a version of Ron Cain's public domain Small-C modified by John Howard Palevich to run on the Atari computer hardware. Palevich also wrote the Atari 8-bit game Dandy for APX. The syntax supported by Deep Blue C is close to that of ANSI C with significant limitations. The compiler creates binary code for Intel 8080 processor which is then executed by an 8080 virtual machine.

The source code to the compiler was sold by APX as Deep Blue Secrets.

Limitations
The following language constructs are not supported:

 structs
 unions
 multidimensional arrays
 floating point numbers
 sizeof operator
 type casting
 functions returning types other than integer

Other non-standard properties of Deep Blue C:

 The last part of switch clause must end with: break, continue, or return.
 The maximum length of a source code line has to be less than 80 characters.
 The number of arguments for functions cannot exceed 126.
 $( and $) are used instead of { and }, because the Atari keyboard and standard character set does not include braces.

Sample program
This program prints "Hello World!":

  main()
  $(
    printf("Hello World!");
  $)

References

C (programming language) compilers
Atari 8-bit family software
Atari Program Exchange software